HMS J1 (later HMAS J1) was a J-class submarine operated by the Royal Navy and the Royal Australian Navy.

Design and construction

They had a displacement of 1,210 tons surfaced, and 1,820 tons submerged. The propulsion system was built around three propeller shafts; the J-class were the only triple-screwed submarines ever built by the British. Propulsion came from three 12-cylinder diesel motors when on the surface, and electric motors when submerged.

Armament consisted of six 18-inch (450 mm) torpedo tubes (four forward, one on each beam), plus a 4-inch deck gun. Originally, the gun was mounted on a breastwork fitted forward of the conning tower, but the breastwork was later extended to the bow and merged into the hull for streamlining, and the gun was relocated to a platform fitted to the front of the conning tower. 44 personnel were aboard.

J1 was built by HM Dockyard at Portsmouth in Hampshire, and launched on 6 November 1915.

Service history

J1 operated in patrols in the North Sea. In November 1916, a German force of half a destroyer flotilla, three dreadnoughts, and a battlecruiser set out from port to rescue two submarines  and  that were stranded in fog off Jutland. On the return, having only rescued one of the submarines, the force passed J1 off Horns Reef on 5 November 1916. The dreadnoughts did not sink, but reached port and underwent repairs.

The submarine was later transferred to Gibraltar for operations in the Mediterranean.

After the war, the British Admiralty decided that the best way to protect the Pacific region was with a force of submarines and cruisers. To this end, they offered the six surviving submarines of the J class to the Royal Australian Navy as gifts. The flotilla reached Thursday Island on 29 June, and Sydney on 10 July. Because of the submarines' condition after the long voyage, they were immediately taken out of service for refits.

J1 and J4, plus Platypus, sailed on 10 February 1920 for Geelong, where a submarine base was established. Apart from local exercises and a 1921 visit to Tasmania, the submarines saw little use, and by June 1922, the cost of maintaining the boats and deteriorating economic conditions saw the six submarines decommissioned and marked for disposal.

Fate
The submarine was paid off on 12 July 1922. J1 was sold to the Melbourne Salvage Company on 26 February 1924.

Citations

References

External links

 

British J-class submarines
Ships built in Portsmouth
1915 ships
World War I submarines of the United Kingdom
Scuttled vessels of Australia
Royal Navy ship names
Underwater diving sites in Australia
Shipwrecks of Victoria (Australia)